Arnulf II (960 or 961 – 30 March 987) was Count of Flanders from 965 until his death.

Life
He was the son of Baldwin III of Flanders and Mathilde Billung of Saxony, daughter of Herman, Duke of Saxony. His father Baldwin III died in 962, when Arnulf was just an infant, whilst Arnulf's grandfather, Arnulf I, was still alive. When Arnulf I died three years later (965), the regency was held by his kinsman Baldwin Balso, who died in 973.

By the time Arnulf attained his majority in 976, Flanders had lost some of the southern territory acquired by Arnulf I. The latter had given some parts of Picardy to King Lothar of France to help assure his grandson's succession, and gave Boulogne as a fief to another relative. Then early in Arnulf's minority Lothar had taken Ponthieu and given it to Hugh Capet, and the first counts of Guînes had established themselves. Arnulf died on 30 March 987 at age 26. Shortly after Arnulf's death his widow married King Robert II of France.

Family
In 976, he married Rozala of Italy, daughter of Berengar II of Italy, and had two children:
Baldwin IV (980–1035), who succeeded his father. He married twice and fathered Baldwin V.
 Mathilde, who died before 995.

Notes

References

See also

Counts of Flanders family tree

House of Flanders
Arnulf 2
Medieval child monarchs
960s births
987 deaths
Year of birth uncertain